Kampong Junjongan (also Kampong Junjungan) is a village in the south of Brunei-Muara District, Brunei, about  from the capital Bandar Seri Begawan. The population was 2,006 in 2016. It is one of the villages within Mukim Pengkalan Batu. The postcode is BH2123.

Facilities 
Junjongan Primary School is the village primary school. It also shares grounds with Junjongan Religious School, the village school for the country's Islamic religious primary education.

The village mosque is Kampong Junjongan Mosque; it was built in 1998 and can accommodate 250 worshippers.

References 

Junjongan